The Spidernaut is a concept for an extra-vehicular robot being developed by NASA's Lyndon B. Johnson Space Center. 

According to NASA's web site, the upcoming generation of space science platforms and vehicles are too large and too fragile to launch and deploy as self-contained payloads. Constructing and maintaining these structures in orbit presents unique challenges which may be overcome by Extra-Vehicular Robotics (EVR) using gentler methods of locomotion and manipulation. New EVR robot archetypes are needed to fill this role.

An arachnid climber such as Spidernaut is a prime candidate for such operations. The multi-point stance of an arachnid's eight legs, with as many as 7 down during a step, allows simply-supported footholds that spread climbing loads more evenly across a space structure and impart no torques.

Such a system could carry large payloads, transporting structural materials across an extensive solar array or mirrors across a telescope without significant structural loading. This archetype could also exploit hybrid forms of locomotion such as routing and deploying a "web" of space tethers to cross structural spans where even light forces are unacceptable.

Source: NASA (used in accordance with NASA's terms of use)

References
 Spidernaut at JSC

Space program of the United States